This is a complete list of episodes of the British animated children's series Bing, which aired from 2014 to 2015, with new episodes in 2019 totalling 104 episodes so far. Each episode has a duration of 7 minutes.

Series overview

Episodes

Series 1 (2014–15)

Series 2 (2019)

References

Lists of British animated television series episodes
Bing is sent to take over as cbeebies dock10